Abraham M. George is an Indian-American businessman, academic, and philanthropist. He is the founder of The George Foundation (TGF), a non-profit organization based in Bangalore, India dedicated to the welfare and empowerment of economically and socially disadvantaged populations in India. His foundation has initiated numerous projects in poverty alleviation, education, healthcare, lead poisoning prevention, women's empowerment, and press freedom. He founded the Shanti Bhavan school to help provide free education to socially disadvantaged kids from age 4 through college.

George has also been recognized as one of the world's leading social entrepreneurs.

Early years
George was born and brought up in the seaside city of Trivandrum, Kerala, at the southwestern tip of India.  He is the second son of Mathew and Aleyamma George, one of four children.

At fourteen, George was admitted to the National Defence Academy in Khadakwasla.  He subsequently went on to graduate as a second-lieutenant in a medium artillery regiment of the Indian Army.  George's first posting in 1966 was to the Northeast Frontier that borders China, following the Chinese invasion of 1962.

The assignment  in Se La in Northeast Frontier of India ended abruptly after only ten months when George was injured in a dynamite explosion. Upon his return from convalescence, he was assigned to the Indo-Pakistan border, where he served for nearly two more years and rose to the rank of captain. "George has spoken of his time in the army as formative experience: "There is, I suppose, some stage in each one’s life that has a greater impact on his future than all others. For me, it was these army experiences that helped shape much of my outlook on life."

In 1968, the third year of George's service, he suffered a hearing disability.  At the time, doctors in India were not trained to tackle his medical condition; it required specialized surgery.  By this point, his mother was already in the United States, teaching physics and working for NASA as a research scientist. His mother's position afforded him the opportunity to come to America where he could have his surgery and start a new life.

Education and professional life
George joined his mother in Alabama during the heyday of the segregationist governor, George Wallace. He found the transition to be overwhelming, later writing of it: "I felt I had gone to another world, not simply another country".

Soon after arriving in America, George attended New York University's Stern School of Business as a graduate student.  During that time, he became an American citizen.  He specialized in developmental economics and international finance, and soon after completing his doctoral work he decided to enter the teaching profession.  Later, Chemical Bank, now part of JP Morgan Chase Bank, offered George a job as an officer in the bank which he accepted.

George had worked for Chemical Bank for two years when he decided in 1976 to start his own company, Multinational Computer Models, Inc (MCM), which would offer computerized systems to large multinational corporations to enable them to deal with their international financial risks. MCM subsequently formed a joint venture with the global investment bank Credit Suisse First Boston where George served as the Chief Consultant and Managing Director of its new operations.  In 1998, George sold MCM to SunGard Data Systems, a Fortune 500 company, where he served as a Vice-Chairman for two years.  He was on the boards of Vellore Christian Medical College & Hospital, International Center for Journalists, and Human Rights Watch. He is an adjunct professor at New York University Stern School of business.

The George Foundation and Shanti Bhavan Educational Trust
George returned to India in January 1995 after a long absence. His intent was to reduce the injustices and inequalities of which he had become aware and to this end he established The George Foundation, a non-profit charitable trust . One of his initial projects, Shanti Bhavan Residential School, offers world-class education and care to children from the poorest segment of India who are also from the dalit or "untouchable" castes. As of 2017, after 20 years of the school's operations, the first four batches have now graduated from college and are employed by global companies like Mercedes Benz, Goldman Sachs, Ernst & Young and others -- an accomplishment that has no parallel in India's social history. In 2021, six Shanti Bhavan graduates received admission to Stanford, Dartmouth, Hofstra, Duke, Princeton, Middlebury, and Northwestern universities for undergraduate studies. 

The Shanti Bhavan story is told by the life-journey of five of its girls in a four-part Netflix documentary, Daughters of Destiny.

Writing
George has authored several books and articles on international finance

  International Finance Handbook (2 volumes), John Wiley & Sons
  Foreign exchange Management and the Multinational Corporation, Holt, Rinehart and Winston
  Protecting Shareholder Value: International Financial Risk Management, Prentice Hall

Since becoming a full-time philanthropist, George has written several articles and has published two books:
  India Untouched: The Forgotten Face of Rural Poverty, Writer's Collective - A description of Dr. George's initial 10 years of social work in rural India.
  Lead Poisoning Prevention and Treatment: Implementing a National Program in Developing Countries --distributed by World Bank to governments of developing countries in 2001 for policy implementation.

Awards

 NYU Stern School of Business' Stewart Satter Social Entrepreneurship Award, USA
 Spirit of India Award, American India Foundation, USA
 Hind Ratna Award, Non-Resident Indian Association, New Delhi
 Millennium Awards, Indian American Kerala Cultural and Civic Center, USA
 GOPIO (Global Organization of People of India Origin) 2017 Community Service Award  
 Lifetime Achievement Award for contribution to social projects by Kerala Samaj, New York.

References

External links
 The George Foundation
   Shanti Bhavan Residential School 
 National Referral Centre for Lead Poisoning in India
 Indian Institute of Journalism New Media
 NYU Stern Alumni Magazine feature
 Blog: Uncovering the truth about poverty
 Net Impact and WIVP welcome Dr. Abraham George to Wharton

Businesspeople from Thiruvananthapuram
Indian philanthropists
Indian emigrants to the United States
Rural community development
Agrarian politics
New York University Stern School of Business alumni
Living people
1946 births
Indian activists